Weisse or Weiße is a surname which means "white" in German. It may refer to:

People
 Charles H. Weisse (1866–1919), American politician
 Christian Felix Weiße (1726–1804), German writer
 Christian Hermann Weisse (1801–1866), German Protestant religious philosopher
 Michael Weiße (c.1488–1534), German theologian and hymn writer

See also
 Weiße Frauen, type of female elf in Germanic mythology

Weis (disambiguation)
Weise (disambiguation)
Weiser (disambiguation)
Weiss (disambiguation)
Weisz (disambiguation)